Marcel Herrand (8 October 1897 – 11 June 1953) was a French stage and film actor best remembered for his roles in swashbuckling or historical films.

He appeared in over 25 films between 1932 and 1952, but Herrand's best remembered role is as Lacenaire (based on Pierre François Lacenaire) in Marcel Carné's Children of Paradise (Les Enfants du Paradis, 1945). Other films in which Herrand appeared include The Last Days of Pompeii (1950) and Fanfan la Tulipe (1952), which also featured Gérard Philipe and Gina Lollobrigida, in which Herrand played the role of Louis XV of France.

Selected filmography 
 The Pavilion Burns (1941) … Audignane
 Les Visiteurs du soir (1942) … Baron Renaud
 The Count of Monte Cristo (1943) … Bertuccio
 The Mysteries of Paris (1943) … Rodolphe
 Les Enfants du paradis (1945) … Lacenaire
 Father Serge (1945)
 Fantômas (1946) … Fantômas
 Star Without Light (1946) ... Roger Marney
 The Royalists (1947) … Corentin
 Dilemma of Two Angels (1948)
 Ruy Blas (1948) … Don Salluste
 The Mystery of the Yellow Room (1949) … Larsan
 The Perfume of the Lady in Black (1949) … Larsan
 The Last Days of Pompeii (1950) … Arbax
 No Pity for Women (1950)
 Wolves Hunt at Night (1952) … Pedro
 Fanfan la Tulipe (1952) … King Louis XV
 La Putain respectueuse (1952) … Senator Clarke

References

External links
 

1897 births
1953 deaths
French male film actors
French male stage actors
Male actors from Paris
20th-century French male actors